is a 2010 kaiju film directed by Tomoo Haraguchi. An international co-production of Japan and the United States, it stars Misato Hirata, Mika Sakuraba, and Ryuki Kitaoka. In the film, a series of military experiments result in the appearance of a giant irradiated monster rivaled by a colossal mutant kappa (an amphibious, turtle-like yōkai).

Cast
 Misato Hirata as Kanako
 Mika Sakuraba as Yuriko
 Daniel Aguilar Gutiérrez as Professor Tanaka
 Ryuki Kitaoka as National Guard

The film features cameo appearances by Hideaki Anno and Shinji Higuchi.

Reception
Steven Sloss of Our Culture Mag noted the film's use of traditional tokusatsu special effects techniques, but criticized its humor, calling it "among the very worst of the kaiju genre". Rob Hunter, writing for Film School Rejects, complimented the film's miniature city set and monster fight sequences but lamented that "Death Kappas giant monster madness doesn't begin until halfway through the film though, and until then we're stuck with a mixed bag of scenes, gags, and characters that never quite come together as a whole." Spencer Perry of ComicBook.com called the film "preposterous and amateurish throughout", but concluded that "Even when the absurd effects are laughable it doesn't sway from the film's relentless enthusiasm for what it's trying to do."

References

External links
 

American horror films
2010s Japanese films
Kaiju films
2010s monster movies
Works about kappa (folklore)
Yōkai in popular culture
Japanese horror films
2010s American films